The Republic of Baden was a German state that existed during the time of the Weimar Republic, formed after the abolition of the Grand Duchy of Baden in 1918. It is now part of the modern German state of Baden-Württemberg.

History

Revolution in Baden
With revolution threatening the German Empire in the dying days of World War I, the state ministry of the Grand Duchy of Baden passed an electoral reform on 2 November 1918 in a final attempt to preserve the monarchy there. On 8 November, workers' and soldiers' councils were established in Lahr and Offenburg. On the following day, similar councils were established in Mannheim and Karlsruhe and the entire Badische state ministry stepped down.

On 10 November 1918 a provisional government was formed by revolutionaries in Karlsruhe and an assembly of the various revolutionary councils took place on the following day. On 13 November Grand Duke Frederick II relinquished all governing duties; he eventually abdicated on 22 November, following the abdication of his first cousin Kaiser Wilhelm II (announced on 9 November and formalised on 28 November).

The provisional government declared the establishment of the freie Volksrepublik Baden (Free People's Republic of Baden) on 14 November 1918, and set 5 January 1919 as the date for new elections.

Republic
A national assembly was created on 12 January 1919, with the Christian democratic Centre Party emerging as the strongest party ahead of the centre-left SPD. Together, these two parties received 91.5% of all votes. On 1 April, the Badische parliament (Landtag) formed a government from members of the Weimar Coalition. Until 1933, Baden was mostly governed by the Centre Party.

On 21 March 1919, the Landtag unanimously passed a new constitution. A popular vote approved of the constitution on 13 April. This popular vote was the first in German history and the Baden constitution was the only one passed by popular vote in Germany during the Weimar period.

Nazi rule
After the Nazi seizure of power, Baden, like all other German states, was subjected to the process of Gleichschaltung (coordination). On 8 March 1933, Robert Heinrich Wagner was sent to Baden as the Reichskommissar for police and displaced the elected President of Baden three days later. Subsequent to the enactment of the "Second Law on the Coordination of the States with the Reich" on 7 April, Wagner was appointed to the new position of Reichsstatthalter (Reich Governor). At that point, Walter Köhler was installed by Wagner as the  Nazi-appointed Minister-President, although executive power in the region truly rested with Wagner who was also the Nazi Party Gauleiter of Baden. Additionally, on 30 January 1934, the Reich government enacted the "Law on the Reconstruction of the Reich," formally abolishing all the states' Landtage and transferring the sovereignty of the states to the central government. Between August 1940 and May 1945, Gau Baden was renamed "Baden-Elsass" and extended westwards to include the occupied French district of Alsace.

Post-war
Through the Allied occupation of post-war Germany, Baden was divided between the American and French occupation zones. The division was made so that the Autobahn connecting Karlsruhe and Munich (today the A8) was completely contained within the American zone. This northern American-administered area became part of the state of Württemberg-Baden on 19 September 1945 while the southern half was placed under French administration and became the state of South Baden or simply "Baden," With this action, the Republic of Baden was dissolved. Subsequently, both entities became constituent states of West Germany on its founding on 23 May 1949. They later were reunited and merged with the state of Württemberg on 23 April 1952 to form the new state of Baden-Württemberg.

Administration 

Baden was subdivided into four administrative districts (Landeskommissärbezirke, similar to the modern Regierungsbezirke) based in Karlsruhe, Mannheim, Freiburg and Konstanz. These districts were further divided into a total of 53 Amtsbezirke (in 1924, this number was reduced to 40). These were divided again into a total of 1,536 municipalities.

Leaders 
Following the constitution, passed in 1921, the President of Baden was an elected from the standing members of the Baden Landtag for a 1-year term. After Gleichschaltung, Baden was governed by appointed Nazi officials.

Notes

References 

Former republics
Former states and territories of Baden-Württemberg
States of the Weimar Republic
Republic